The Silk Road is a number of trade routes across the Afro-Eurasian landmass.

Silk Road may also refer to:

Art, entertainment, and media

Films and television
 The Silk Road (Japanese TV series), a 1980 documentary produced by Japan's NHK
 The Silk Road (film), a 1988 Japanese film
 The Maritime Silk Road (film), a 2011 Iranian movie
 The Silk Road (UK TV series), a 2016 documentary by the BBC, in 3 episodes, presented by Sam Willis
 Silk Road (film), about the online marketplace of the same name

Games
 Silkroad Online, a 2005 free multiplayer online game

Literature
 Silk Road, a novel by Jeanne Larsen
 Silk Road, a book by Eileen Ormsby of All Things Vice
 Silk Road, 2011 book written by Colin Falconer (writer)
 The Silk Roads: A New History of the World, 2015 book written by Peter Frankopan
  The Silk Road: Trade, Travel, War and Faith, 2004 book written by Susan Whitfield
 Silk Roads. Peoples, Cultures, Landscapes., 2019 book written by Susan Whitfield

Music
Silk Road (album), a 1997 album by Art Farmer
Silk Road, for string quartet Tan Dun
Silk Road Fantasia, Zhao Jiping 
Silk Road, album by Kitarō 
Silk Road Suite, a 1996 musical compositions by Kitarō for the NHK documentary series
 "Silk Road", song by Rick Ross from Black Market (Rick Ross album)

Theater
 Silk Road Rising, a theater company in downtown Chicago

Organizations and commerce
 Silk Road (marketplace), anonymous online black market (Tor hidden service) best known for the illegal drug trade, shut down in 2013
 Silk Road Project, a non-profit organization initiated by cellist Yo-Yo Ma
 SilkRoad, Inc., a multinational corporation that provides human resources software services

Other
 Silk Road disease, an inflammatory disorder

See also
 Maritime Silk Road (disambiguation)
 New Silk Road (disambiguation)
 Silk Route (disambiguation)
 Silk Way (disambiguation)
 Belt and Road Initiative